There are at least 86 named mountains in Ravalli County, Montana.
 Bald Top Mountain, el. 
 Bare Cone, el. 
 Bare Hill, el. 
 Bare Peak, el. 
 Bass Peak, el. 
 Beaver Point, el. 
 Bitterroot Mountains, el. 
 Black Bear Point, el. 
 Blacktail Point, el. 
 Blue Mountain, el. 
 Blue Nose, el. 
 Boulder Peak, el. 
 Boulder Point, el. 
 Brandy Peak, el. 
 Canyon Peak, el. 
 Castle Rock, el. 
 Chaffin Butte, el. 
 Cleveland Mountain, el. 
 Cliff Point, el. 
 Cold Spring Hill, el. 
 Como Peaks, el. 
 Coyote Peak, el. 
 Deer Creek Point, el. 
 Deer Mountain, el. 
 Dineen Hill, el. 
 Dome Shaped Mountain, el. 
 Dominic Buttes, el. 
 Dominic Point, el. 
 Don Mackey Point, el. 
 Doran Point, el. 
 Downing Mountain, el. 
 Dutch Hill, el. 
 El Capitan, el. 
 Falls Point, el. 
 Gash Point, el. 
 Goat Mountain, el. 
 Grouse Butte, el. 
 Harlan Point, el. 
 Heavenly Twins, el. 
 Hilltop, el. 
 Hughes Point, el. 
 Indian Hill, el. 
 Jew Mountain, el. 
 Jim Hell Rock, el. 
 Kent Peak, el. 
 Koch Mountain, el. 
 Lookout Mountain, el. 
 Mill Point, el. 
 Mount Jerusalem, el. 
 Mountain House, el. 
 North Trapper Peak, el. 
 Old Stormy, el. 
 Owen Point, el. 
 Palisade Mountain, el. 
 Piquett Mountain, el. 
 Pyramid Buttes, el. 
 Quartzite Mountain, el. 
 Ranger Peak, el. 
 Razorback Mountain, el. 
 Reed Butte, el. 
 Rocky Knob, el. 
 Rombo Mountain, el. 
 Saddle Mountain, el. 
 Saint Joseph Peak, el. 
 Saint Mary Peak, el. 
 School Point, el. 
 Schoolhouse Butte, el. 
 Shirley Mountain, el. 
 Shook Mountain, el. 
 Skalkaho Mountain, el. 
 Slate Point, el. 
 Sugarloaf Peak, el. 
 Sula Peak, el. 
 Sweeney Peak, el. 
 Tabor Mountain, el. 
 The Lonesome Bachelor, el. 
 Threemile Point, el. 
 Thunder Mountain, el. 
 Totem Peak, el. 
 Trapper Peak, el. 
 Ward Mountain, el. 
 West Mountain, el. 
 Whe-lha-kleh-tseen Mountain, el. 
 Whites Mountain, el. 
 Wiles Peak, el. 
 Willow Mountain, el.

See also
 List of mountains in Montana
 List of mountain ranges in Montana

Notes

Ravalli